Marshall Lance Nelson (born 31 January 1994) is an Australian-Belgian professional basketball player for the Rockingham Flames of the NBL1 West. Debuting in the State Basketball League (SBL) in 2014 for the Perth Redbacks, Nelson went on to play three seasons of college basketball in the United States and has played in Sweden and Iceland. He has had two stints in the National Basketball League (NBL), first with the Illawarra Hawks as a development player between 2017 and 2019 and then with the Cairns Taipans as an injury replacement during the 2021–22 season. He played his sixth season with the Redbacks in 2021 and helped them win the SBL championship in 2017. He holds a Belgian passport.

Early life
Nelson was born in the U.S. state of Minnesota and moved to Perth, Western Australia, when he was four years old. He attended Lesmurdie Senior High School and played in the Western Australian Basketball League (WABL) for the Kalamunda Eastern Suns as a junior.

Basketball career

Early years in SBL and college (2014–2017)
Nelson debuted in the State Basketball League (SBL) in 2014 for the Perth Redbacks. In 30 games, he averaged 7.9 points, 2.63 rebounds and 1.07 assists per game.

For the 2014–15 U.S. college season, Nelson played for Community College of Rhode Island and earned Region 21 NJCAA all-conference honours. In the final game of the season, he scored a season-high 22 points. In 24 games, he averaged 9.7 points, 4.3 rebounds and 1.6 assists per game.

In May 2015, Nelson re-joined the Perth Redbacks. In 12 games to finish the 2015 SBL season, he averaged 11.0 points, 4.5 rebounds and 1.33 assists per game.

For the 2015–16 U.S. college season, Nelson transferred to Wayland Baptist University of the National Association of Intercollegiate Athletics (NAIA). He played in 32 games for the Pioneers and averaged 9.8 points, 2.7 rebounds and 1.4 assists per game. He helped the Pioneers win the 2016 Sooner Athletic Conference (SAC) finals.

Nelson continued on with Wayland Baptist for the 2016–17 season. On 10 December 2016, he scored 43 points a 102–99 overtime win over Sul Ross State. It was the most scored by a Pioneer in the 21st century and was just seven off the school record of 50 points set in 1955–56. He was subsequently named SAC Player of the Week. In 20 games, he averaged 12.1 points, 2.3 rebounds and 2.45 assists per game.

In May 2017, Nelson re-joined the Perth Redbacks. He helped the Redbacks reach the SBL Grand Final, where they defeated the Joondalup Wolves 103–70 to win the championship. Nelson recorded 17 points, four assists and three rebounds in the grand final with 14 of those points coming in the second half. In 20 games to finish the 2017 SBL season, he averaged 15.45 points, 4.55 rebounds and 3.3 assists per game.

Illawarra Hawks and Canberra Gunners (2017–2019)
Following the SBL season, Nelson moved to Wollongong to join the Illawarra Hawks as a development player for the 2017–18 NBL season. After not playing during the NBL season, the Hawks sent him to play with the Canberra Gunners in the SEABL for the 2018 season. The Gunners finished with 20 losses and zero wins, as Nelson averaged 16.1 points and 3.2 assists in his 15 games.

Nelson continued on with the Hawks as a development player, this time on a contract, in the 2018–19 NBL season. In 15 games, he averaged 2.2 points and 1.2 rebounds per game.

Perth Redbacks and Europe (2019–2021)
In March 2019, Nelson returned to the Perth Redbacks for the 2019 SBL season. He averaged a league-leading 27.96 points per game and earned All-SBL First Team honours. In 24 games, he also averaged 6.33 rebounds and 4.62 assists.

On 29 November 2019, Nelson signed with Jämtland Basket of the Swedish Basketball League for the rest of the 2019–20 season. In 14 games, he averaged 8.6 points, 3.0 rebounds, 2.9 assists and 1.4 steals per game.

Nelson was set to play for the Bendigo Braves in the 2020 NBL1 South season, but due to the COVID-19 pandemic, the NBL1 season was cancelled. He subsequently returned to Perth and played for the Redbacks in the West Coast Classic. He appeared in all 13 games, averaging 21.92 points, 6.92 rebounds and 4.62 assists per game.

On 3 February 2021, Nelson signed with U.M.F. Grindavík of the Icelandic top-tier Úrvalsdeild karla for the rest of the 2020–21 season. He broke his finger in April and subsequently returned to Perth. In eight games, he averaged 16.5 points, 3.9 rebounds, 5.9 assists and 1.4 steals per game.

In June 2021, Nelson joined the Redbacks for the rest of the 2021 NBL1 West season. In 14 games, he averaged 20.07 points, 6.42 rebounds and 4.92 assists per game.

Cairns Taipans (2021–2022)
On 30 December 2021, Nelson signed with the Cairns Taipans as an injury replacement for Scott Machado. He made his debut for the Taipans the next day, recording two points and two rebounds in five minutes off the bench in an 84–78 loss to the Perth Wildcats. He was released from the Taipans roster on 17 March 2022. In 10 games during the 2021–22 NBL season, he averaged 3.3 points, 1.1 rebounds and 1.0 assists per game.

Rockingham Flames (2022–present)

Nelson joined the Rockingham Flames for the 2022 NBL1 West season. On 28 May, he scored 39 points in an 81–65 win over the Willetton Tigers. On 24 June, he recorded 26 points, 10 rebounds and 12 assists in a 102–93 loss to the Perry Lakes Hawks. On 1 July, he scored 39 points in a 114–110 overtime win over the Perth Redbacks. He helped the Flames finish the regular season in second place with an 18–4 record and helped guide them to the NBL1 West Grand Final, where they defeated the Geraldton Buccaneers 91–79 to win the championship behind Nelson's 19 points. For the season, he earned All-NBL1 West First Team honours. In 20 games, he averaged 21.85 points, 6.5 rebounds, 4.5 assists and 1.25 steals per game. At the NBL1 National Finals, the team was crowned national champions with an 85–74 win over the Frankston Blues in the championship game.

In November 2022, Nelson re-signed with the Flames for the 2023 NBL1 West season.

National team career
In August 2022, Nelson played in a number of exhibition games for the Belgium national team.

Personal life
Nelson has Belgian citizenship and holds a Belgian passport.

References

External links

NBL profile
NBL1 profile
SBL stats
Wayland Baptist bio

1994 births
Living people
Australian expatriate basketball people in Sweden
Australian expatriate basketball people in the United States
Australian men's basketball players
Basketball players from Perth, Western Australia
Cairns Taipans players
Community College of Rhode Island alumni
Grindavík men's basketball players
Illawarra Hawks players
Jämtland Basket players
Point guards
Shooting guards
Úrvalsdeild karla (basketball) players
Wayland Baptist Pioneers men's basketball players